Christian Otto Carl Lasson (3 July 1830 – 7 July 1893) was a Norwegian barrister.

Personal life
Lasson was born in Christiania to jurist and politician Peder Carl Lasson (1798-1873) and Ottilia Pauline Christine von Munthe af Morgenstierne (1804-1886). In 1857 he married his cousin Alexandra Cathrine Henriette von Munthe af Morgenstierne (1838-1881). They had eleven children; among them were composer Per Lasson, painter Oda Krohg and singer Bokken Lasson.

Career
Lasson was barrister with access to work with the Supreme Court from 1861. He served as Attorney General of Norway from 1873 to 1893. He was decorated Knight of the Order of St. Olav in 1885.

References

1830 births
1893 deaths
Lawyers from Oslo